Insulacebus is an extinct monotypic genus of New World monkey found on the island of Hispaniola from Late Quaternary deposits. Fossils of the type species Insulacebus toussaintiana have been recovered from the Plain of Formon, Department du Sud, southwestern Haiti. The dentally primitive I. toussaintiana was likely derived from a fauna that was evolving on the mainland before the Miocene monkey bed of the Honda Group of central Colombia, and stems from a pre-Middle Miocene colonization from the South American mainland.

See also 
 Fossil primates of Central and South America and the Caribbean
 Hispaniola monkey of the Dominican Republic
 Jamaican monkey of Jamaica
 Paralouatta of Cuba

References 

Night monkeys
Prehistoric monkeys
Holocene extinctions
Monotypic prehistoric primate genera
Prehistoric primate genera
Prehistoric mammals of North America
Endemic fauna of Hispaniola
Extinct animals of Haiti
Mammals of Haiti
Mammals of Hispaniola
Fossil taxa described in 2011